Raghunath Choudhary (1879–1967) was an Indian writer of the Jonaki era or the romantic era of Assamese literature. Choudhary is known as Bihogi Kobi (poet of birds) because most of his writings are based on birds and nature. Choudhary also took part in the Indian independence movement and was imprisoned by the British for the same. He was the president of Tezpur session of Asam Sahitya Sabha in 1936. Kamrup Sanjeevani Sabha conferred him with the title Kabiratna.

Short biography
He was born in Lawpara village in Undivided Kamrup district (present Nalbari district) in the year 1879. He had his early schooling at Guwahati. He died on 18 November 1967.

Literary career
Choudhary's first poem was published in 'Jonaki' magazine. He used Sanskrit and Arabic in his literary works.

His other works includes: Amongst all his first literary work was Xaadori in 1910.  
 Poetry books
 Xaadori (1910)
 Keteki (1918)
 Kaarbala (1923)
 Dohikatara (1931)
 Navamallika (1958)
Gulap

As a magazines editor
 Jayanti (1936–38), 
 Surabhi (1940, 1942–44), 
 Moina, a children's magazine (1923),
 Jonaki (Sub-editor)

See also
 Assamese literature
 List of people from Assam
 List of Asam Sahitya Sabha presidents
 List of Assamese writers with their pen names

References

External links
 Poet Raghunath Choudhary remembered, Published at The Assam Tribune, 25 January 2013.

1879 births
1967 deaths
Poets from Assam
Assamese-language poets
People from Kamrup district
Asom Sahitya Sabha Presidents
Indian independence activists from Assam
20th-century Indian poets
Indian male poets
20th-century Indian male writers